Hanan Fadida (born 1 December 1981) is a retired Israeli football striker.

References

1981 births
Living people
Israeli footballers
Israeli football managers
Association football forwards
Maccabi Ironi Ashdod F.C. players
F.C. Ashdod players
PFC Levski Sofia players
Beitar Jerusalem F.C. players
Hapoel Ironi Kiryat Shmona F.C. players
Hapoel Jerusalem F.C. players
Hapoel Be'er Sheva F.C. players
Hapoel Ashkelon F.C. players
Hapoel Kfar Saba F.C. players
Maccabi Kiryat Malakhi F.C. players
Hapoel Marmorek F.C. players
Hapoel Azor F.C. players
Hapoel Ashdod F.C. players
Liga Leumit players
Israeli Premier League players
First Professional Football League (Bulgaria) players
Footballers from Ashdod
Israeli expatriate footballers
Expatriate footballers in Bulgaria
Israeli expatriate sportspeople in Bulgaria